Lifetime is the third studio album by the Australian band Real Life. The album is the first release by the band without co-founder Richard Zatorski involvement. The tracks "God Tonight" and "Kiss the Ground" reached the Modern Rock and Dance charts in the United States.

Reception

Tomas Mureika from AllMusic believed the album was "better than much of the pop music out at the time, it feels too much like a commercial product rather than a labor of passion like Heartland or Flame." adding ""Kiss the Ground" "Push of Love" and "Let's Start a Fire" are all perfectly solid synth pop songs—but, alas, the era of synth pop was over by 1990 and Sterry had yet to discover the type of music that would ultimately make Real Life great again."

Track listing

Release history

References

1990 albums
Real Life (band) albums